Maddock Films Pvt. Ltd. is an Indian film & web series production company founded by film director and producer Dinesh Vijan. Established in 2005, Maddock Films has produced critically and commercially acclaimed Hindi films such as, Love Aaj Kal (2009) Cocktail (2012), Badlapur (2015), Hindi Medium (2017), Stree (2018), Luka Chuppi (2019), Bala (2019), and Mimi (2021).

Films

Web series

References

2010 establishments in Maharashtra
Film production companies of India